Panama–Spain relations refers to the diplomatic relations between Panama and Spain. Both nations are members of the Association of Academies of the Spanish Language and the Organization of Ibero-American States.

History

Spanish colonization

In 1501, Spanish explorer Rodrigo de Bastidas became the first European to enter the territory of Panama and claimed it for Spain. In 1502, Christopher Columbus sailed along the shores of Panama. In 1510, Spanish explorer Diego de Nicuesa founded the first settlement in Panama and named it Nombre de Dios. In September 1513, Spanish conquistador Vasco Núñez de Balboa arrived to Panama and became the first European to lead an expedition to have seen the Pacific Ocean. In 1513, Panama officially became part of the Spanish Empire.

In 1514, Pedro Arias Dávila became the first governor of the territory of Panama. Governor Arias Dávila founded the city of Panama City which he made into the capital of the territory. Once in power, he ordered the beheading of Balboa in 1517 on a charge of treason. Governor Arias Dávila also ordered murderous attacks against the indigenous population, whom he roasted alive and/or fed to dogs. During this period, Panama became an important territory for Spain as it is situated between the Spanish territories of New Spain and the territories of South America. In 1717, Panama became part of the Viceroyalty of New Granada.

Independence

In 1808, Joseph Bonaparte was installed as King of Spain and several Spanish American colonies began to declare their independence from Spain. From 10 – 28 November 1821, residents of Panama led a bloodless revolt against Spain and declared its independence on 28 November 1821. With the approval of Simón Bolívar, Panama joined the union of Gran Colombia which included Colombia, Ecuador and Venezuela.

In 1831, the union collapsed and Panama remained joined to Colombia until 1903 when the Senate of Colombia refused to ratify the Hay–Herrán Treaty which would have allowed the United States to lease the Panama Canal for 100 years. The United States soon supported the independence of Panama for which Spain recognized in 1903.

Post-Independence

In May 1904, Panama and Spain officially established diplomatic relations. In 1915, Spain completed the construction of an embassy in Panama City. During the Spanish Civil War (1936-1939) several Spaniards immigrated to Panama seeking refuge. In September 1977, King Juan Carlos I of Spain paid an official visit to Panama, the first of three visits.

From 1983 to 1989, Manuel Noriega ruled Panama. During the United States invasion of Panama, Noriega fled to the Vatican's Apostolic Nunciature in Panama. While there, Noriega asked the Spanish government for refugee in Spain. Spain refused Noriega's offer as Spain had a standing extradition treaty with the United States.

On 31 December 1999, Spanish King Juan Carlos I traveled to Panama and met with Panamanian President Mireya Moscoso and assisted the transition of the Panama Canal to Panamanian control. In July 2014, Spanish Prime Minister Mariano Rajoy paid an official visit to Panama. In September 2014, Panamanian President Juan Carlos Varela paid an official visit to Spain.

Bilateral relations
Both nations have signed several bilateral agreements such as a Treaty of Peace and Friendship (1953); Agreement on Social Cooperation (1966); Agreement on Cultural Cooperation (1979); Agreement on Economic and Trade Cooperation (1982); Agreement on Scientific and Technical Cooperation (1983); Agreement on the reciprocal Promotion and Protection of Investments (1997); Extradition Treaty (1997); Air Transportation Agreement (2001) and an Agreement between the Ministries of Health of Panama and Spain for the formation of Health Personnel.

Transportation
There are direct flights between Panama and Spain with Iberia airlines.

Trade
In 2017, trade between Panama and Spain totaled €443 million Euros. Panama's main exports to Spain include: frozen tuna and lobster and palm oil. Spain's main exports to Panama include: perfume, medications, steel and iron for construction purposes, automobile and trams, electrical wiring and ceramic coverings. In 2016, Spanish investments in Panama totaled €14 million Euros, with most of the investments going into the food and paper industries. Spanish multinational companies such as Mapfre, Telefónica and Zara operate in Panama.

Resident diplomatic missions
 Panama has an embassy in Madrid and consulates-general in A Coruña, Barcelona, Las Palmas and Valencia.
 Spain has an embassy in Panama City.

See also
 Foreign relations of Panama 
 Foreign relations of Spain
 Panamanian Spanish

References 

 
Spain
Panama